The women's 100 metre butterfly event at the 2014 Commonwealth Games as part of the swimming programme took place on 24 and 25 July at the Tollcross International Swimming Centre in Glasgow, Scotland.

The medals were presented by Pamela Young, Chef de mission of Saint Helena at the 2014 Commonwealth Games and Secretary of the National Sports Association of Saint Helena and the quaichs were presented by Perry Crosswhite, Chief Executive Officer of the Australian Commonwealth Games Association.

Records
Prior to this competition, the existing world and Commonwealth Games records were as follows.

The following records were established during the competition:

Results

Heats

Semifinals

Final

References

External links

Women's 0100 metre butterfly
Commonwealth Games
2014 in women's swimming